The Fengtai–Shacheng railway, also known as the Fengsha railway, is a dual-track, electrified, railroad in northern China.  The Fengtai–Shacheng railway runs  from Fengtai District in western Beijing Municipality to the town of Shacheng in Huailai County, Hebei Province.  The line passes through Beijing's Fengtai, Shijingshan and Mentougou Districts, and Huailai County in northern Hebei.  The original single track line was built from 1952 to 1955.  The second track was added in 1972.  The line was electrified in 1984.

Line description

The Fengsha railway runs up the Yongding River Valley from Fengtai District in southwest Beijing through the Taihang Mountains and across the Guanting Reservoir to Shacheng, on the Beijing–Baotou railway.  The line crosses the Yongding River eight times through rugged terrain and has 67 tunnels and 81 bridges in all.  The shortest tunnel, No. 056, just  in length, is the shortest standard gauge rail tunnel in China.

The famous late Qing Dynasty railway engineer Jeme Tien Yow considered routing the Beijing–Zhangjiakou railway through the Yongding River Valley, but abandoned the approach due to high construction costs.  The line was built in 1952 as an alternative route to Beijing–Baotou railway for the shipment of coal from Shanxi.  The Fengsha railway avoids the steep incline at Nankou near Badaling on the Jingbao Line. A marble stele by the entrance to Tunnel No. 1 near Liuliqu Village commemorates the 108 soldiers who died building the initial line.

Rail connections
 Fengtai: Beijing–Shanghai Railway
 Shijingshan South: Beijing–Yuanping railway
 Shacheng: Beijing–Baotou railway

See also
 List of railways in China

References

Railway lines in China
Rail transport in Beijing
Rail transport in Hebei